The Philippines' Bureau of Agriculture and Fisheries Product Standards (abbreviated as BAFS), is an agency of the Philippine government under the Department of Agriculture responsible for setting and implementing standards for fresh primary and secondary processed agricultural and fishery products.

History
The Bureau of Agriculture and Fisheries Standards (BAFS) under the Department of Agriculture was established in December 1997 as provided for by Republic Act No. 8435 (1997) or the Agriculture and Fisheries Modernization Act. Its major duties include formulating and enforcing standards of quality in the processing, preservation, packaging, labeling, importation, exportation, distribution and advertising of fresh and primary agricultural and fisheries products. BAFPS also provides assistance n establishing the scientific basis for food safety, trade standards and codes of practice and harmonizes them with internationally accepted standards and practices.

BAFPS serves as the National Enquiry Point for Codex Alimentarius and other food safety and
standards regulatory bodies. It is in charge of monitoring and disseminating information on
international developments in food safety.

References

External links
Official website
GAIN Report

Department of Agriculture (Philippines)